Leslie J. Edhlund (December 21, 1911 – January 12, 1994) was an American politician and mechanical engineer.

Edhlund was born in Welcome, Martin County, Minnesota. He went to the Mechanic Art High School in Saint Paul, Minnesota and to Macalester College. Edhlund also went to the University of Minnesota and to the Dunwoody College of Technology. He lived in Saint Paul, Minnesota with his wife and family. Edhlund worked for 3M and was a mechanical engineer. Edhlund served in the Minnesota House of Representatives in 1963 and 1964.

References

1911 births
1994 deaths
Politicians from Saint Paul, Minnesota
People from Martin County, Minnesota
Macalester College alumni
University of Minnesota alumni
American mechanical engineers
3M people
Members of the Minnesota House of Representatives